Major General Michael John Hatley Walsh,  (10 June 1927 – 13 October 2015) was a British Army officer. He was the Scout Association's Chief Scout from 1982 to 1988.

Education
Walsh was born on 10 June 1927 in Harrogate, West Riding of Yorkshire. He was educated at two independent schools: at Clifton House School in Harrogate, Yorkshire and at Sedbergh School in Cumbria, and was a member of the local Scout Troop. He attained the King's Scout Award with the added distinction of Gold Cords, indicating it as the highest award available in Scouting at the time.

Military career
Walsh joined the King's Royal Rifle Corps as a rifleman in 1944 and was commissioned in 1945. He spent the winter of 1945–46 in northern Italy guarding against incursion by Josip Broz Tito's partisans. After instructing at the Small Arms School and the Jungle Warfare School in Malaya, he was seconded to the 3rd Battalion of the Parachute Regiment (known as "3 Para") and went with it to Cyprus in 1956 as a company commander, where he took part in operations against EOKA insurgents.

In November 1956, the Suez Crisis had come to a head and 3 Para was tasked with capturing El Gamil airfield close to Port Said – part of Operation Musketeer. This was the first and last British operational parachute assault since the Second World War. Despite fierce opposition including tanks, the airfield was captured in 30 minutes. After various staff and training appointments, he returned to the role of company commander with 3 Para to take part in the 1964 campaign in the Radfan Mountains in Saudi Arabia. After promotion to lieutenant colonel, he took command of 1 Para on an emergency tour to Aden in January 1967. The battalion was responsible for "Area North" for seven months and were the last British battalion to withdraw. Walsh was awarded the Distinguished Service Order for various actions in June. The citation reads: "By his outstanding devotion to duty, personal bravery and exceptional powers of command, Lieutenant-Colonel Walsh contained the situation at Sheikh Othman whilst never departing from the principle of minimum force."

Walsh then held staff appointments with British Army of the Rhine (BAOR) and the 28th ANZUK Infantry Brigade in Singapore. He was appointed Assistant Chief of Staff, Intelligence in 1973. Following promotion to major general he took command of 3rd Armoured Division in 1976 and was then appointed Director of Army Training in 1978, retiring in 1981.

Retirement years
Walsh was Knight President of the London-based Society of Knights of the Round Table from 1988 until 1995, the Director of Overseas Relations for St. John Ambulance from 1989 until 1995, and Vice President of the Royal National Lifeboat Institution (RNLI). He died on 13 October 2015.

Awards
 1968 Distinguished Service Order (DSO)
 1980 Companions of the Order of the Bath (CB)
 1986 Commander of the Order of St John (CStJ)
 1993 Knight of the Order of St John (KStJ)
 1996 Commander of the Order of the British Empire (CBE)
 Deputy lieutenant of Greater London

References

|-

1927 births
2015 deaths
People from Harrogate
People educated at Sedbergh School
Chief Scouts (The Scout Association)
King's Royal Rifle Corps officers
British Army major generals
Commanders of the Order of the British Empire
Companions of the Order of the Bath
Companions of the Distinguished Service Order
Deputy Lieutenants of Greater London
Knights of the Order of St John
British military personnel of the Cyprus Emergency
King's Royal Rifle Corps soldiers
British Parachute Regiment officers
British Army personnel of World War II
Military personnel from Yorkshire